Grand Coulee is a town in the Canadian province of Saskatchewan. It is home to an annual event called "The Hoe Down".

Demographics 

References

External links 

Towns in Saskatchewan
Pense No. 160, Saskatchewan
Division No. 6, Saskatchewan